The 2023 Auckland Open (sponsored by ASB Bank) is a joint professional men's and women's tennis tournament played on outdoor hard courts at the ASB Tennis Centre in Auckland. The 36th edition of the women's event (a WTA 250 tournament) is held from 2 to 8 January 2023 and the 45th edition of the men's event (an ATP 250 tournament) will be scheduled from 9 to 14 January 2023. The event is the first to be organized since 2020, after the COVID-19 pandemic forced the cancellation of the 2021 and 2022 tournaments.

Champions

Men's singles 

  Richard Gasquet def.  Cameron Norrie, 4–6, 6–4, 6–4

Women's singles 

  Coco Gauff def.  Rebeka Masarova 6–1, 6–1

Men's doubles 

  Nikola Mektić /  Mate Pavić def.  Nathaniel Lammons /  Jackson Withrow,  6–4, 6–7(5–7), [10–6]

Women's doubles 

  Miyu Kato /  Aldila Sutjiadi def.  Leylah Fernandez /  Bethanie Mattek-Sands 1–6, 7–5, [10–4]

Points and prize money

Point distribution

Prize money 

1 Qualifiers' prize money is also the Round of 32 prize money
* per team

ATP singles main draw entrants

Seeds 

1 Rankings as of 2 January 2023.

Other entrants 
The following players received wildcards into the singles main draw:
  Ugo Humbert
  Kiranpal Pannu
  Ben Shelton

The following players received entry from the qualifying draw:
  Grégoire Barrère
  Christopher Eubanks
  Jiří Lehečka
  Thiago Monteiro

The following players received entry as lucky losers:
  Federico Coria
  João Sousa

Withdrawals  
  Francisco Cerúndolo → replaced by  João Sousa
  Pedro Martínez → replaced by  Federico Coria
  Holger Rune → replaced by  J. J. Wolf

ATP doubles main draw entrants

Seeds 

1 Rankings as of 2 January 2023.

Other entrants 
The following pairs received wildcards into the doubles main draw:
  Alex Lawson /  Artem Sitak 
  Ajeet Rai /  Finn Reynolds

The following pair received entry as alternates:
  Sebastián Báez /  Luis David Martínez

Withdrawals 
Before the tournament
  Pedro Martínez /  Jaume Munar → replaced by  Sebastián Báez /  Luis David Martínez

During the tournament
  Pedro Cachín /  Francisco Cerúndolo 
  Rajeev Ram /  Joe Salisbury

WTA singles main draw entrants

Seeds 

1 Rankings as of 26 December 2022.

Other entrants 
The following players received wildcards into the singles main draw:
  Brenda Fruhvirtová
  Sofia Kenin
  Erin Routliffe
  Venus Williams

The following player received a protected ranking into the singles main draw:
  Karolína Muchová

The following players received entry from the qualifying draw:
  Ysaline Bonaventure
  Nao Hibino
  Viktória Kužmová
  Rebeka Masarova
  Elena-Gabriela Ruse
  Katie Volynets

Retirements 
  Emma Raducanu (twisted ankle)
  Wang Xiyu (sickness)

WTA doubles main draw entrants

Seeds 

1 Rankings as of 26 December 2022.

Other entrants 
The following pairs received wildcards into the doubles main draw:
  Leylah Fernandez /  Bethanie Mattek-Sands 
  Paige Hourigan /  Sachia Vickery

The following pair received entry as alternates:
  Elisabetta Cocciaretto /  Wang Xinyu

Withdrawals 
 Before the tournament
  Monique Adamczak /  Rosalie van der Hoek → replaced by  Monique Adamczak /  Alexandra Osborne
  Wang Xiyu /  Zhu Lin → replaced by  Elisabetta Cocciaretto /  Wang Xinyu
 During the tournament
  Elisabetta Cocciaretto /  Wang Xinyu (sickness)

References

External links 
Official website - Men's tournament

2023 ATP Tour
2023 WTA Tour
2023
2023
ASB
January 2023 sports events in New Zealand